Dutch universities are supported by state funding (with the exception of University Nyenrode) so that universities do not have to rely on private funding to facilitate tuition. All citizens of the Netherlands who complete high school at the pre-academic level (vwo) or have a professional Propedeuse at HBO level, signifying they have finished their first-year of courses are eligible to attend university. In the case of a HBO-Propedeuse some restrictions may apply as to deficiencies in High School subjects. Three universities (Leiden, Utrecht and Groningen) have restrictive requirements based on academic ability; and all universities have restrictive requirements for some of their programs because the number of prospective students sometimes outnumbers the number of available places.

Many Dutch students attend universities relatively far from their parental homes (in contrast to Universities in Italy and Spain for example), although scarcity of accommodation sometimes forces students to commute. As a compensation for this, Dutch students normally receive a card (OV-chipkaart) that allows them to use public transport for free during one part of the week (either workdays or the weekend) and with a discount during the other part. Waiting lists for student accommodation in the Netherlands can be more than a year, particularly in Utrecht and Amsterdam. Which is why many students rent a room in the private sector.

Quality differences between Dutch universities are generally small and the best university in one subject can be the worst in another. This is one of the reasons why none of them tend to end in the top tier of international university ranking systems. All of them, however, score well above average. Instruction at the undergraduate level tends to be is in Dutch, but is in English for most Masters and PhD programs.

Dutch universities used to offer only 4 or 5 year courses. Since 2002 most of them now offer 3 year undergraduate programmes, leading towards a bachelor's degree, and 1 or 2 years Master's programmes. Old habits remain, partly because stopping after a BSc is seen as 'dropping out' and a large majority of university students enroll on master's courses. To confuse matters, students attending Universities of Applied Sciences (HBO) also obtain a bachelor's degree, only the programmes in these institutes usually take 4 years. In the Netherlands these degrees are however not seen as a university education. It is possible to continue after a HBO bachelor's degree to a university master's, with often a pre-master deficiency program or other additional requirements on minimum GPA.

See also
 List of universities in the Netherlands
 Education in the Netherlands
 Academic degrees
 University
British universities
French universities
Italian universities
Spanish universities
US universities

External links 
 Search for officially recognised programmes in the Netherlands
 Accreditation Organisation of the Netherlands and Flanders/Belgium (NVAO)
 The Netherlands Association of Universities of Applied Sciences 
 Studiekeuze123.nl, an overview and comparison of all Dutch-taught studies of the universities in the Netherlands
 Eurogates, a searching database of English-taught programmes and grants for study in Holland
 Directory and Ranking of the Netherlands

References